Andrew Gregg Curtin (April 22, 1815/1817October 7, 1894) was a U.S. lawyer and politician. He served as the 15th governor of Pennsylvania during the American Civil War, helped defend his state during the Gettysburg Campaign, and oversaw the creation of the National Cemetery and the ceremony in which Abraham Lincoln delivered his famous Gettysburg Address.

Early life
Curtin was born in Bellefonte, Pennsylvania. Sources vary as to his birth date. Some list April 22, 1815; others list April 22, 1817. Curtin's gravestone uses the 1815 date. His parents were Roland Curtin Sr., a wealthy Irish-born iron manufacturer from County Clare, and Jane (née Gregg) Curtin, the daughter of U.S. Senator Andrew Gregg. His father, with Miles Boggs, established the Eagle Ironworks at Curtin Village in 1810.

Curtin's family was prominent in Pennsylvania politics and in the Civil War. He was the great-grandson of James Potter, the vice-president of Pennsylvania, and was the grandson of Andrew Gregg, also a prominent Pennsylvania politician. He was the uncle of John I. Gregg and cousin of David McMurtrie Gregg, both Union generals in the Civil War. He was also a cousin of Col. John I. Curtin.

He attended Bellefonte Academy, Dickinson College, and the Dickinson School of Law and was employed as a lawyer.

Career
Curtin first entered politics during the 1840 election, when he campaigned for Whig presidential candidate William Henry Harrison. In 1855, Governor James Pollock appointed him as Superintendent of Public Schools.

Governor of Pennsylvania
With the collapse of the Whig Party, Curtin switched to the newly formed Republican Party and successfully ran for governor of Pennsylvania in 1860.  At the same time, he helped Abraham Lincoln win the Republican nomination for president. A large crowd attended Curtin's inaugural ceremonies on January 15, 1861.

 
Curtin was a strong supporter of President Lincoln's policies in the Civil War, and Curtin committed Pennsylvania to the war effort. Curtin organized the Pennsylvania Reserves into combat units, and oversaw the construction of the first Union military camp for training militia. It opened in an agricultural school nearby Harrisburg as Camp Curtin on April 18, 1861, and more than 300,000 men were drilled there during 4 years. In the years that followed, Curtin became a close friend and confidant of Abraham Lincoln, visiting the White House several times in order to converse about the status of the war effort.

Curtin was very active during the Gettysburg Campaign, working with Major General Darius N. Couch and Major Granville O. Haller to delay Robert E. Lee's Army of Northern Virginia and prevent it from crossing the Susquehanna River. Major General George G. Meade, a Pennsylvania officer whom Curtin had recommended for brigadier general and command of one of the Pennsylvania reserve brigades in 1861, defeated Lee in the Battle of Gettysburg.

After the Battle of Gettysburg, Governor Curtin was the principal force behind the establishment of the National Cemetery there. Through his agent, David Wills, Curtin procured the attendance of President Abraham Lincoln at the dedication of the cemetery. Governor Curtin was sitting with Lincoln on the platform on November 19, 1863, when Lincoln delivered his Gettysburg Address.

In his first term, Governor Curtin suffered a severe breakdown from the stresses of war. Secretary of State Eli Slifer handled governmental affairs during the increasingly frequent periods when Curtin was incapacitated. President Lincoln offered the governor a diplomatic position abroad, but he chose to run for reelection in 1863.

To coordinate Union war efforts, Curtin convened the Loyal War Governors' Conference on September 24 and 25, 1862, in Altoona. This event was one of his most significant contributions to the Union war effort. He formed the Pennsylvania State Agency in Washington, and another branch in Nashville, Tennessee, to provide support for wounded soldiers on the battlefield and returned home. He also founded the state-funded Orphan's School to aid and educate children of military men who had died for the Union cause.

Soon after the war, Curtin was elected a 3rd Class Companion (i.e. honorary member) of the Military Order of the Loyal Legion of the United States in recognition of his support for the Union during the war.

Later career
After the war, Curtin lost his party's Senate nomination to Simon Cameron, and was appointed Ambassador to Russia by President Ulysses S. Grant. Curtin later switched to the Democratic Party, and served as a U.S. Representative from 1881 until 1887.

Personal life
On May 30, 1844, Curtin was married to Katharine Irvine Wilson (1821–1903), a daughter of Dr. William Irvine Wilson and Mary (née Potter) Wilson. Together, they were the parents of:

 Mary Curtin (1845–1927), who married George Fairlamb Harris.
 Martha Irvin Curtin (1848–1935), who married Captain Kidder Randolph Breese.
 Myron Stanley Curtin (1854–1857), who died young.
 Katherine Irvine Wilson Curtin (1859–1930), who married Moses Dewitt Burnet.
 Bessie Elliott Curtin (1865–1866), who died young.

He died at his birthplace of Bellefonte, Pennsylvania, and is buried there in Union Cemetery.

Notes

References
 Eicher, John H., and David J. Eicher. Civil War High Commands. Stanford, CA: Stanford University Press, 2001. .
 
 Retrieved on 2009-03-23

External links

Life and Times of Andrew Gregg Curtin (biography)

 Curtin Clan Association Ancestry Centre

1810s births
1894 deaths
People from Bellefonte, Pennsylvania
American Presbyterians
American people of Irish descent
Pennsylvania Whigs
Pennsylvania Republicans
Ambassadors of the United States to Russia
Dickinson School of Law alumni
People of Pennsylvania in the American Civil War
19th-century American diplomats
Union (American Civil War) state governors
Democratic Party members of the United States House of Representatives from Pennsylvania
Democratic Party governors of Pennsylvania
Republican Party governors of Pennsylvania
Burials in Pennsylvania
19th-century American politicians